This is a listing of event held by the British Association of Mixed Martial Arts.

BAMMA 1: The Fighting Premiership 

BAMMA 1 was a mixed martial arts event held by the British Association of Mixed Martial Arts on 27 June 2009 at the Room by the River in London. The event was televised on Bravo in the United Kingdom.

The event was held in a tournament format, with two semi-finals taking place in the Lightweight, Welterweight and Middleweight divisions. The semi-final winners progressed to the final, which is to take place at a later date.

Results

|-
|Lightweight
|Radek Piechnik
|def
|Spencer McMorris
|TKO (punches)
|align=center|1
|align=center|1:57
|
|-
|Middleweight
| Kes Kpokpogri
|def
|Ben Craggy
|Decision (unanimous)
|align=center|3
|align=center|5:00
|
|-
|Middleweight
|Adam Stanton
|def
|Dan Movahedi
|Submission (arm-triangle choke)
|align=center|1
|align=center|1:08
|

|-
|Lightweight
|Francis Heagney
|def
|Zack Jones
|TKO (punches)
|align=center|1
|align=center|3:08
|
|-
|Lightweight
|Tim Radcliffe
|def
|Abdul Mohamed
|Decision (unanimous)
|align=center|3
|align=center|5:00
|
|-
|Welterweight
|Eugene Fadiora
|def
|Nathan Champ
|Decision (unanimous)
|align=center|3
|align=center|5:00
|
|-
|Welterweight
|Che Mills
|def
|Edgelson Lua
|Decision (unanimous)
|align=center|3
|align=center|5:00
|
|-
|Middleweight
|Denniston Sutherland
|def
|John Phillips
|Submission (punches)
|align=center|1
|align=center|3:32
|
|-
|Middleweight
|Tom Watson
|def
|John Maguire
|TKO (punches)
|align=center|3
|align=center|2:47
|

BAMMA 2: Roundhouses at the Roundhouse 

BAMMA 2 was a mixed martial arts event held by the British Association of Mixed Martial Arts on 13 February 2010 at The Roundhouse in London. The event was televised on Bravo in the United Kingdom.

Mark Adams was scheduled to fight Paul Reed in the main event for the vacant Featherweight Title. However, he was picked up an injury two weeks before the fight and was replaced by Germany's Alan Omer. Omer, also admitted to having an injury but went ahead with the fight nonetheless. Chris Stringer was also set up against AJ Wenn, but Wenn ended up fighting Ali McClean instead.

Results

|-
|Welterweight
|Charlie Leary
|def
|Panayiotis Tsimonos
|TKO (punches)
|align=center|2
|align=center|
|
|-
|Welterweight
|Stuart Rickman
|def
|Nathan Champ
|Submission (rear-naked choke)
|align=center|1
|align=center|
|
|-
|Lightweight
|Peter Duncan
|def
|Alexandre Izidro
|Decision (unanimous)
|align=center|3
|align=center|5:00
|
|-
|Featherweight
|Phil Harris
|def
|Steve McCombe
|Decision (unanimous)
|align=center|3
|align=center|5:00
|

|-
|Lightweight
|Ali McClean
|drew with
|AJ Wenn
|Draw
|align=center|3
|align=center|5:00
|
|-
|Middleweight
|Mike Ling
|def
|Russell Smith
|Submission (rear-naked choke)
|align=center|1
|align=center|4:47
|
|-
|Lightweight
|Rob Sinclair
|def
|Nathan Beer
|TKO (punches)
|align=center|1
|align=center|3:42
|For 1st BAMMA Lightweight Champion
|-
|Welterweight
|Gunnar Nelson
|def
|Sam Elsdon
|Submission (rear-naked choke)
|align=center|1
|align=center|2:30
|
|-
|Featherweight
|Alan Omer
|def
|Paul Reed
|Submission (triangle choke)
|align=center|4
|align=center|2:10
|For 1st BAMMA Featherweight Champion

BAMMA 3: Horwich vs. Watson 

BAMMA 3: Horwich vs. Watson was a mixed martial arts event held by the British Association of Mixed Martial Arts on 15 May 2010 at the LG Arena in Birmingham. It featured three title fights, and was headlined by Matt Horwich and Tom Watson. The event was televised on Bravo in the United Kingdom.

Tabloid celebrity and former MMA fighter Alex Reid was scheduled to return to the cage and face Tom Watson at the event. However, Reid injured his knee while filming his documentary TV series Alex Reid: The Fight of His Life and was forced to pull out of the fight. This angered Watson, who claimed Reid was disrespecting him. Watson also called him a "clown" and said that it was likely Reid pulled out to avoid an embarrassing defeat. Reid was then replaced by UFC and IFL veteran Matt Horwich.

Results

|-
|Featherweight
|Martin McDonagh
|def
|Mike Wood
|Submission (triangle choke)
|align=center|1
|align=center|3:52
|
|-
|Featherweight
|Phil Harris
|def
|Neil Seery
|Decision (unanimous)
|align=center|3
|align=center|5:00
|
|-
|Featherweight
|Ashleigh Grimshaw
|def
|Paul Reed
|KO (punches)
|align=center| 1
|align=center| 1:04
|
|-
|Featherweight
|Jeff Lawson
|def
|David Lee
|Submission (armbar)
|align=center| 1
|align=center| 0:57
|
|-
|Middleweight
|Carl Noon
|def
|Mike Ling
|Submission (rear-naked choke)
|align=center| 1
|align=center| 3:48
|
|-
|Welterweight
|Simeon Thoresen
|def
|John Maguire
|Decision (unanimous)
|align=center|3
|align=center|5:00
|

|-
|Featherweight
|Mark Adams
|def
|Alan Omer
|Decision (unanimous)
|align=center|5
|align=center|5:00
|For BAMMA Featherweight Champion
|-
|Welterweight
|War Machine
|def
|Zach Light
|Technical submission (rear-naked choke)
|align=center|1
|align=center|1:09
|
|-
|Lightweight
|Rob Sinclair
|def
|Daniel Weichel
|TKO (punches)
|align=center|1
|align=center|4:03
|For BAMMA Lightweight Champion
|-
|Light Heavyweight
|Seth Petruzelli
|def
|Ryan White
|Submission (armbar)
|align=center|1
|align=center|1:07
|
|-
|Middleweight
|Tom Watson
|def
|Matt Horwich
|Decision Unanimous
|align=center|5
|align=center|5:00
|For 1st BAMMA Middleweight Champion

BAMMA 4: Reid vs. Watson 

BAMMA 4: Reid vs. Watson was a mixed martial arts event held by the British Association of Mixed Martial Arts on 25 September 2010 at the National Indoor Arena in Birmingham. The event was televised on Bravo in the United Kingdom.

Rob Sinclair was also set to defend his lightweight title against Claes Beverlöv, though Beverlöv later pulled out due to injury and was replaced by fellow Swede Jani Lax. Lax would then withdraw on 22 September.

Results

|-
|Middleweight
|Robert Devane
|def
| Colin Lewis
|Submission (guillotine choke)
|align=center|1
|align=center|1:02
|
|-
|Welterweight
|Tom Breese
|def
|Shah Hussein
|Submission (rear naked choke)
|align=center|2
|align=center|2:57
|
|-
|Lightweight
|Harvey Harra
|def
|David Round
|Submission (guillotine choke)
|align=center| 2
|align=center| 1:18
|
|-
|Lightweight
|Stuart Davies
|def
|Scott Jansen
|Submission (armbar)
|align=center| 1
|align=center| 2:31
|

|-
|Lightweight
|AJ Wenn
|def
|Tim Newman
|Submission (rear-naked choke)
|align=center| 2
|align=center| 1:21
|
|-
|Welterweight
|Simeon Thoresen
|def
|Marco Santi
|Submission (rear naked choke)
|align=center|1
|align=center|3:59
|
|-
|Welterweight
|Gunnar Nelson
|def
|Eugene Fadiora
|Submission (rear naked choke)
|align=center|1
|align=center|3:51
|
|-
|Catchweight (187 lbs)
|John Phillips
|def
|James Zikic
|TKO (punches)
|align=center|1
|align=center|1:34
|
|-
|Middleweight
|Tom Watson
|def
|Alex Reid
|Decision (unanimous)
|align=center|5
|align=center|5:00
|For BAMMA Middleweight Championship

BAMMA 5: Daley vs. Shira 

BAMMA 5: Daley vs. Shira was a mixed martial arts event held by the British Association of Mixed Martial Arts on 26 February 2011 at the MEN Arena in Manchester.

Background

BAMMA 5 was the first BAMMA event held outside of Birmingham or London. The event was originally scheduled to take place at the Metro Radio Arena in Newcastle on 4 December 2010 and headlined by a heavyweight bout between Stav Economou and Bob Sapp. However, due to snowstorms in the UK the event was cancelled.

It was then rescheduled for 26 February 2011 at the MEN Arena in Manchester. In January 2011, it was reported that Paul Daley was in advanced talks to headline the event. It was also reported by Scott Coker of Strikeforce that Paul Daley would only fight the winner of Nick Diaz and Evangelista Santos if he wins at BAMMA 5.

The main event was scheduled to award the vacant Welterweight title match but was changed to a non-title contest when Paul Daley failed to make the required weight by just 0.88 pounds (400 grams).

This event aired live on the UK TV channel SyFy, as part of a new TV deal. It was also broadcast live around the world on www.bammatv.com as an online stream pay per view, a first for the organization.

Results

BAMMA 6: Watson vs. Rua 

BAMMA 6: Watson vs. Rua was a mixed martial arts event held by the British Association of Mixed Martial Arts on 21 May 2011 at the Wembley Arena in London.

Background

BAMMA 6 was announced during the television presentation of BAMMA 5. This was the first BAMMA event to be held at the Wembley Arena. Phil Baroni pulled out of a bout against Matt Ewin and Ivan Salaverry stepped in 3 weeks out.

BAMMA 6: Watson vs. Rua was named as the best event of 2011 at the UK MMA Awards.

Results

BAMMA 7: Trigg vs. Wallhead 

BAMMA 7: Trigg vs. Wallhead was a mixed martial arts event held by the British Association of Mixed Martial Arts on 10 September 2011 at the NIA Arena in Birmingham.

Background

Tom Watson was originally set to defend his Middleweight Championship against Frank Trigg. However, on 9 August, it was announced that Watson had to pull out due to a back injury and was replaced with Jim Wallhead.

BAMMA held its first ever British Middleweight title fight to crown the first champion in their new British title division aimed at developing a British champion in each weight class.

Paul Daley fought Jordan Radev in his second BAMMA appearance. Daley ended up missing the welterweight weight limit by 6 pounds on the day of the weigh ins. The bout still went on at a catchweight of 176 pounds.

BAMMA will also hold its very first bantamweight bout with Érik Pérez vs. James Brum on the undercard.

Efrain Escudero was scheduled to face Tim Radcliffe in a lightweight bout. However, on 6 September, it was announced that visa issues prevented his travel to the United Kingdom.

Rob Sinclair was supposed to defend his World Lightweight Championship against Leonardo Santos. The bout, however, was canceled after Santos refused to fly to the event. Diego Vital stepped up on one day's notice to take the fight.

Results

BAMMA 8: Manuwa vs. Rea 

BAMMA 8: Manuwa vs. Rea was a mixed martial arts event held by the British Association of Mixed Martial Arts (BAMMA) on 10 December 2011, at the Capital FM Arena in Nottingham.

Background

This event was meant to hold the BAMMA debut of Nate Marquardt, but it has been pushed back to 2012 and will be against Yoshiyuki Yoshida. Marquardt has shown his desire for his opponent to be UFC, Cage Rage, Strikeforce and BAMMA veteran Paul Daley. Daley, however, later decided not to take the fight, citing that between having already competed 5 times in 2011 from 21 October and being such a high-stakes fight, it was in his best interest to look have his next fight in 2012 so he can rest up and work out a gameplan against Marquardt.

UCMMA Light Heavyweight Champion Jimi Manuwa has signed a four-fight deal with BAMMA and made his promotional debut on this show.

UFC Hall of Fame member and MMA legend Randy Couture will be appearing at BAMMA 8 to meet fans and sign copies of his new book 'The Last Round'.

Andre Winner was slated to fight Niko Puhakka in a lightweight title eliminator. However Puhakka was pulled from the card and replaced by Diego Gonzalez.

Results

BAMMA 9: Watson vs. Marshman 

BAMMA 9: Watson vs. Marshman was a mixed martial arts event held by the British Association of Mixed Martial Arts (BAMMA) on 24 March 2012, at the National Indoor Arena in Birmingham.

Background

Marshman became the first Welsh mixed martial artist to headline a major MMA event.

This event was due to be held on 11 February 2012, at the LG Arena in Birmingham but was moved to 24 March 2012 at the National Indoor Arena in Birmingham due to unforeseen circumstances.

Nate Marquardt was due to headline the main event however this is no longer the case since he mutually cancelled his BAMMA contract.

BAMMA 9 aired on a week's delay on Extreme Sports Channel in the UK (Channel 419 on Sky and Channel 527 on Virgin).

Sam Hooker and Rus Smith were expected to fight on the card, however due to injuries they were replaced by Luke Barnatt and Lewis Long respectively.

Results

|-
|Lightweight
|Jake Murphy
|def
|David Round
|Submission (rear naked choke)
|align=center|2
|align=center|1:40
|
|-
|Light Heavyweight
|Rab Truesdale
|def
|Sam Mensah
|TKO (elbows)
|align=center|1
|align=center|4:32
|
|-
|Middleweight
|Luke Barnatt
|def
|Lee Johnson
|Submission (rear naked choke)
|align=center|1
|align=center|2:36
|
|-
|Heavyweight
|Mark Godbeer
|def
|Catalin Zmarandescu
|TKO (corner stoppage)
|align=center|1
|align=center|5:00
|
|-
|Lightweight
|Dale Hardiman
|def
|Antanas Jazbutis
|Decision (unanimous)
|align=center|3
|align=center|5:00
|
|-
|Welterweight
|Leeroy Barnes
|def
|Matt Ewin
|Submission (guillotine choke)
|align=center|2
|align=center|4:57
|
|-
|Middleweight
|Patrick Vallee
|def
|Andrew Punshon
|Submission (armbar)
|align=center|2
|align=center|2:16
|

|-
|Welterweight
|Tom Breese
|def
|Mark Tucker
|TKO (knees)
|align=center|2
|align=center|1:40
|
|-
|Light Heavyweight
|Jason Jones
|def
|Przemyslaw Mysiala
|TKO (cuts)
|align=center|1
|align=center|3:51
|
|-
|Lightweight
|Colin Fletcher
|def
|Jason Ball
|Decision (unanimous)
|align=center|3
|align=center|5:00
|
|-
|Middleweight
|Tom Watson
|def
|Jack Marshman
|TKO (punches and elbows)
|align=center|2
|align=center|4:50
|For BAMMA World Middleweight Championship

BAMMA 10: Sinclair vs. Winner 

BAMMA 10: Sinclair vs. Winner was a mixed martial arts event held by the British Association of Mixed Martial Arts (BAMMA) on 15 September 2012, at Wembley Arena in London.

Background

This will mark the first mixed martial arts event to be part of a ground-breaking deal with Channel 5. The event will air live on Channel 5's sister channel – 5*, and then the following week a highlights package will be shown on Channel 5.

On 11 July, BAMMA announced that the main event will have Rob Sinclair defending his World Lightweight title against The Ultimate Fighter: United States vs. United Kingdom finalist and UFC veteran Andre Winner.

One 20 July, BAMMA announced the co-main event bout, which will have Jack Marshman defending his British Middleweight title against Andrew Punshon.

Fight Card

|-
|Lightweight
|Marc Allen
|def
|Lee Taylor
|Decision (split)
|align=center| 3
|align=center| 5:00
|
|-
|Light Heavyweight
| Max Nunes
|def
|Tony Moran
|Submission (triangle choke)
|align=center| 1
|align=center| 2:58
|
|-
|Light Heavyweight
|Sam Mensah
|def
|Mike Neun
|KO (punch)
|align=center| 1
|align=center| 0:08
|
|-
|Lightweight
|Jeremy Petley
|def
|Dyson Roberts
|Submission (rear naked choke)
|align=center| 2
|align=center| 4:45
|
|-
|Lightweight
|Tommy Maguire
|def
|Antanas Jazbutis
|Decision (unanimous)
|align=center| 3
|align=center| 5:00
|
|-
|Welterweight
|Tom Breese
|def
|Jack Magee
|Submission (triangle choke)
|align=center| 1
|align=center| 3:19
|
|-
|Lightweight
|Curt Warburton
|def
|Lee Wieczorek
|Decision (unanimous)
|align=center| 3
|align=center| 5:00
|

|-
|Middleweight
|Denniston Sutherland
|def
|Leeroy Barnes
|Decision (unanimous)
|align=center| 3
|align=center| 5:00
|
|-
|Middleweight
|Jack Marshman
|def
|Andrew Punshon
|Submission (triangle choke)
|align=center| 1
|align=center| 2:31
|For BAMMA British Middleweight Championship for Punshon only, Marshman came in overweight so title was made vacant after he won.
|-
|Lightweight
|Rob Sinclair
|def
|Andre Winner
|Decision (split) (47-48, 49-46, 48-47)
|align=center| 5
|align=center| 5:00
|For BAMMA World Lightweight Championship

BAMMA 11: Marshman vs. Foupa-Pokam 

BAMMA 11: Marshman vs. Foupa-Pokam was a mixed martial arts event held by the British Association of Mixed Martial Arts (BAMMA) on 1 December 2012, at National Indoor Arena in Birmingham.

Background

Alex Reid is set to return to BAMMA at this event.

This event will also crown the first BAMMA British Welterweight Champion and the first British Lightweight Champion.

UCMMA Light Heavyweight champion Linton Vassell was scheduled to face Jason Jones at this event as the co-main event, but Vassell had to pull out due to injury.

The event made history in the UK as the first MMA event to have been shown live on terrestrial television. However, there has been controversy over the layout of the event in the one-hour timeframe. On Channel 5, the only fight to have been shown live was Alex Reid vs Sam Boo, and then highlights of what was supposed to have been the main event, Jack Marshman vs. Xavier Foupa-Pokam. Reid had not fought for over a year by this point and admitted going into the fight that he was very rusty and had not been training properly until September, and this reflected in the fight as it was described by The Mirror as scrappy, at times it was dirty (both men were deducted points for fouls during the bout) and slow-paced. Overall many critics and fans felt that it was the wrong fight to present as the historic first live fight on Channel 5.

Fight Card

|-
|Light Heavyweight
|Mike Neun
|def.
|Thomas Denham
|TKO (punches and elbows)
|align=center|3
|align=center|3:58
|
|-
|Bantamweight
|Dawid Farycki
|def.
|Bryan Creighton
|TKO (punches)
|align=center|2
|align=center|4:25
|
|-
|Welterweight
|Leon Edwards
|def.
|Jonathan Bilton
|TKO (knees)
|align=center|2
|align=center|1:11
|
|-
|Middleweight
|Yannick Bahati
|def.
|Ben Constatine
|Decision (unanimous)
|align=center|3
|align=center|5:00
|
|-
|Featherweight
|Andrew Fisher
|def.
|Andy Green
|TKO (elbows)
|align=center|1
|align=center|2:26
|
|-
|Lightweight
|Marc Allen
|def.
|Kyle Redfearn
|Decision (split)
|align=center|3
|align=center|5:00
|
|-
|Lightweight
|Jeremy Petley
|def.
|Richie Downes
|Decision (unanimous)
|align=center|3
|align=center|5:00
|
|-
|Bantamweight
|James Doolan
|def.
|Spencer Hewitt
|Submission (triangle choke)
|align=center|1
|align=center|1:42
|
|-
|Light Heavyweight
|Marcin Lazarz
|Sam Mensah
|Submission (armbar)
|align=center|1
|align=center|4:16
|
|-
|Light Heavyweight
|Max Nunes
|def.
|Kevin Thompson
|TKO (punches)
|align=center|1
|align=center|1:40
|

|-
|Lightweight
|Steven Ray
|def.
|Dale Hardiman
|Decision (Unanimous)
|align=center|3
|align=center|5:00
|For 1st BAMMA British Lightweight Championship
|-
|Welterweight
|Tom Breese
|def.
|Warren Kee
|Submission (rear-naked choke)
|align=center|1
|align=center|3:06
|For 1st BAMMA British Welterweight Championship
|-
|Middleweight
|Alex Reid
|def.
|Sam Boo
|Decision (unanimous)
|align=center|3
|align=center|5:00
|
|-
|Middleweight
|Xavier Foupa-Pokam
|def.
|Jack Marshman
|Decision (split)
|align=center|3
|align=center|5:00
|

BAMMA 12: Wallhead vs. Veach 

BAMMA 12: Wallhead vs. Veach was a mixed martial arts event held by the British Association of Mixed Martial Arts (BAMMA) on 9 March 2013, at Metro Radio Arena in Newcastle upon Tyne.

Background

Results

|-
|Bantamweight
|James MacAllister
|def.
|Steve McCombe
|Submission (rear-naked choke)
|align=center|2
|align=center|3:08
|
|-
|Heavyweight
|Mahmood Besharate
|def.
|Steven Gardener
|Unanimous decision
|align=center|3
|align=center|5:00
|
|-
|Light Heavyweight
|Tom Denham
|def.
|Brett McDermott
|Submission (rear-naked choke)
|align=center|2
|align=center|3:58
|
|-
|Middleweight
|Leeroy Barnes
|def.
|Steve Watson
|Submission (guillotine choke)
|align=center|1
|align=center|0:47
|
|-
|Middleweight
|Scott Askham
|def.
|Harry McLeman
|Submission (rear-naked choke)
|align=center|3
|align=center|4:13
|
|-
|Lightweight
|Ryan Scope
|def.
|Luke Newman
|Submission (triangle choke)
|align=center|1
|align=center|4:00
|

|-
|Lightweight
|Curt Warburton
|def.
|Stevie Ray (c)
|Unanimous decision
|align=center|5
|align=center|5:00
|For BAMMA British Lightweight Championship
|-
|Light Heavyweight
|Max Nunes
|def.
|Marcin Lazarz
|TKO (punches)
|align=center|3
|align=center|1:12
|
|-
|Welterweight
|Jim Wallhead
|def.
|Matt Veach
|Submission (rear naked choke)
|align=center|1
|align=center|3:05
|

BAMMA 13: Night of Champions 

BAMMA 13: Night of Champions was a mixed martial arts event held by the British Association of Mixed Martial Arts (BAMMA) on 14 September 2013, at National Indoor Arena in Birmingham.

Background

The event crowned the promotion's first World Light Heavyweight and World Welterweight champions as well as crowned a new World Lightweight Champion, which mas made vacant by Rob Sinclair when he signed to Bellator MMA. Max Nunes faced Jason Jones for the Light Heavyweight title, Jim Wallhead took on Eddy Ellis for the Welterweight title & Curt Warburton faced off against Mansour Barnaoui for the Lightweight title.

After a short stint in the UFC, Colin Fletcher returned to BAMMA at this event for a bout against Tim Newman.

Results

|-
|Lightweight
|efferson George
|def.
|Mariusz Marzec
|Submission (rear naked choke)
|align=center|2
|align=center|4:37
|
|-
|Lightweight
|Tim Wilde
|def.
|Stephen Martin
|Decision (unanimous)
|align=center|3
|align=center|5:00
|
|-
|Middleweight
|Harry McLeman
|def.
|Matt Hallam
|Submission (guillotine choke)
|align=center|2
|align=center|0:48
|
|-
|Flyweight
|Rany Saadeh
|def.
|Danny Missin
|TKO (knees)
|align=center|2
|align=center|4:13
|
|-
|Flyweight
|Mahmood Besharate
|def.
|Joe Laurence
|Decision (unanimous)
|align=center|3
|align=center|5:00
|
|-
|Welterweight
|Leon Edwards
|def.
|Adam Boussif
|Submission (arm triangle choke)
|align=center|1
|align=center|2:10
|
|-
|Middleweight
|Ion Pascu
|def.
|Jack Marshman
|KO (punches)
|align=center|1
|align=center|4:08
|
|-
|Middleweight
|Scott Askham
|def.
|orge Luis Bezerra
|Decision (unanimous)
|align=center|3
|align=center|5:00
|For vacant BAMMA World Middleweight Championship

|-
|Lightweight
||Colin Fletcher
|def.
|Tim Newman
|Decision (unanimous)
|align=center|3
|align=center|5:00
|
|-
|Lightweight
|Mansour Barnaoui
|def.
|Curt Warburton
|TKO (punches and elbows)
|align=center|1
|align=center|4:08
|For vacant BAMMA World Lightweight Championship
|-
|Welterweight
|Eddy Ellis
|def.
|Jim Wallhead
|Decision (split)
|align=center|3
|align=center|5:00
|For 1st BAMMA World Welterweight Championship
|-
|Light Heavyweight
|Jason Jones
|def.
|Max Nunes
|Submission (arm triangle choke)
|align=center|2
|align=center|3:50
|For 1st BAMMA World Light Heavyweight Championship

BAMMA 14: Daley vs. da Silva 

BAMMA 14: Daley vs. da Silva was a mixed martial arts event held by the British Association of Mixed Martial Arts (BAMMA) on 14 December 2013, at LG Arena in Birmingham.

Background
Paul Daley made his return to BAMMA at this event with a KO victory against Romário Manoel da Silva, and Mansour Barnaoui defended his lightweight title for the first time when he defeated Colin Fletcher.

Scott Askham was scheduled to defend his Middleweight Championship against Ion Pascu, but had to withdraw due to an injury. Max Nunes dropped weight and was announced as the replacement to face Pascu in a Middleweight bout.

Results

|-
|Bantamweight
|Ed Authur
|def.
|Ben Rees
|TKO
|align=center|1
|align=center|5:00
|
|-
|Middleweight
|Matt Hallam
|def.
|Curtis Widmer
|TKO
|align=center|1
|align=center|2:15
|
|-
|Welterweight
|Tim Menzies
|def.
|James Samuda
|TKO
|align=center|3
|align=center|3:16
|
|-
|Lightweight
|Tim Wilde
|def.
|Jefferson George
|TKO (doctor stoppage)
|align=center|1
|align=center|3:42
|
|-
|Featherweight
|Andy Craven
|def.
| Zi Shah
|Submission (heel hoke)
|align=center|1
|align=center|0:37
|
|-
|Middleweight
|Harry McLeman
|def.
|Matt Howard
|Decision (unanimous)
|align=center|3
|align=center|5:00
|
|-
|Welterweight
|Leon Edwards
|def.
|Wendle Lewis
|KO
|align=center|1
|align=center|1:20
|
|-
|Featherweight
|Tom Duquesnoy
|def.
|James Saville
|TKO
|align=center|2
|align=center|4:04
|
|-
|Welterweight
|Wayne Murrie
|def.
|Michael Johnson
|Submission (rear naked choke)
|align=center|1
|align=center|3:23
|For Vacant BAMMA British Welterweight Championship

|-
|Middleweight
|Max Nunes
|def.
|Ion Pascu
|Decision (unanimous)
|align=center|3
|align=center|5:00
|
|-
|Welterweight
|Jim Wallhead
|def.
|Florent Betorangal
|KO (takedown)
|align=center|3
|align=center|0:21
|
|-
|Lightweight
|Mansour Barnaoui (c)
|def.
|Colin Fletcher
|Submission (rear naked choke)
|align=center|1
|align=center|4:00
|For BAMMA World Lightweight Championship
|-
|Welterweight
|Paul Daley
|def.
|Romário Manoel Da Silva
|KO (punch)
|align=center|2
|align=center|1:42
|
|}

BAMMA 15: Thompson vs. Selmani 

BAMMA 15: Thompson vs. Selmani was a mixed martial arts event held by the British Association of Mixed Martial Arts (BAMMA) on 5 April 2014, at the Copper Box Arena in London.

Fight Card

|-
|Bantamweight
|Ed Arthur
|def.
|Nathaniel Wood
|Submission (rear naked choke)
|align=center|3
|align=center|1:48
|
|-
|Welterweight
|Jacek Toczydlowski
|def.
|Benny Carr
|Submission (strikes)
|align=center|1
|align=center|1:32
|
|-
|Welterweight
|Alex Montagnani
|def.
|Nathan Jones
|Submission (rear naked choke)
|align=center|1
|align=center|2:43
|
|-
|Featherweight
|Andy Craven
|def.
|Richard Edwards
|Submission (rear naked choke)
|align=center|1
|align=center|2:12
|
|-
|Lightweight
|Jefferson George
|def.
|Jack Grant
|Decision (split)
|align=center|3
|align=center|5:00
|
|-
|Flyweight
|Rany Saadeh
|def.
|Mahmood Besharate
|Decision (unanimous)
|align=center|3
|align=center|5:00
|
|-
|Welterweight
|Ryan Scope
|def.
|Ali Arish
|Decision (unanimous)
|align=center|3
|align=center|5:00
|
|-

|-
|Middleweight
|arry McLeman
|Andy De Vent
|Decision (unanimous)
|align=center|3
|align=center|5:00
|For The Vacant BAMMA British Middleweight Championship
|-
|Featherweight
|Tom Duquesnoy
|def.
|Teddy Violet
|Submission (triangle choke)
|align=center|2
|align=center|1:23
|For The Vacant BAMMA World Featherweight Championship
|-
|Lightweight
|Colin Fletcher
|def.
|Tony Hervey
|Decision (split)
|align=center|3
|align=center|5:00
|
|-
|Welterweight
|Leon Edwards 
|def.
|Wayne Murray (c)
|Submission (rear naked choke)
|align=center|1
|align=center|3:13
|For the BAMMA British Welterweight Championship
|-
|Heavyweight
|Gzim Selmani
|def.
|Oli Thompson
|Technical Submission (guillotine choke)
|align=center|1
|align=center|0:18
|}

BAMMA Fight Night: Southampton 

BAMMA Fight Night: Southampton was a mixed martial arts event held by the British Association of Mixed Martial Arts (BAMMA) on 7 June 2014, at the O2 Guildhall in Southampton.

It is the first Fight Night in a series of events intended to bring the BAMMA franchise to smaller cities and towns across the UK, the shows will give contracted fighters more opportunities to compete in addition to developing more localised talent.

Fight Card

|-
|Middleweight
|Damien Koryga
|def.
|Ricky Mitchell
| Submission (guillotine choke)
|align=center| 2
|align=center| 1:35
|
|-
|Featherweight
|Josh Row
|def.
|Andy Hannon
|Decision (unanimous)
|align=center| 3
|align=center| 5:00
|
|-
|Middleweight
|Marcus Mitchell
|def.
|Nick Jones
|TKO (strikes)
|align=center| 1
|align=center| 1:49
|
|-

|-
|Catchweight
|Artem Kotov
|def.
|Alexei Roberts
|TKO (strikes)
|align=center| 1
|align=center| 1:04
|
|-
|Bantamweight
|Ed Arthur
|def.
|Michael Cutting
|Submission (rear naked choke)
|align=center| 2
|align=center| 1:58
|
|-
|Featherweight
|Ashleigh Grimshaw
|def.
|Dragan Pesic
|Submission (arm triangle choke)
|align=center| 1
|align=center| 3:35
|
|-
|Welterweight
|Alex Montagnani
|def.
|Tim Menzies
|KO (flying knee)
|align=center| 1
|align=center| 1:28
|
|-
|Middleweight
|Scott Askham (c)
|def.
|Max Nunes
|TKO (strikes)
|align=center| 3
|align=center| 1:30
|For the BAMMA World Middleweight Championship

BAMMA Fight Night: Liverpool 

BAMMA Fight Night: Liverpool was a mixed martial arts event that was held by the British Association of Mixed Martial Arts (BAMMA) on 2 August 2014, at the Liverpool Olympia.

It is the second Fight Night event scheduled to be held by the BAMMA franchise.

Fight Card

|-
|Lightweight
|Anthony O'Connor
|def.
|Beau Gavin
|Submission (rear naked choke)
|align=center|2
|align=center|0:57
|
|-
|Lightweight
|Tim Barnett
|def.
|Dion Wyton
|TKO (submission to punches)
|align=center|1
|align=center|2:19
|
|-
|Middleweight
|Igor Puskarsis
|def.
|Lee Williams
|Decision (unanimous)
|align=center|3
|align=center|5:00
|
|-
|Featherweight
|Ben Dearden
|def.
|James Reece
|Submission (armbar)
|align=center|2
|align=center|2:59
|
|-
|Welterweight
|Jai Herbert
|def.
|Mick Stanton
|Submission (rear naked choke)
|align=center|3
|align=center|2:34
|
|-
|Flyweight
|Mike Berry
|def.
|Danny Missin 
|Submission (rear naked choke)
|align=center|1
|align=center|3:45
|
|-
|Lightweight
|Greg Severs
|def.
|Jamie Reynolds
|Decision (unanimous)
|align=center|3
|align=center|5:00
|
|-
|Bantamweight
|Michael Cutting
|def.
|Richard Edwards
|Submission (armbar)
|align=center|2
|align=center|4:20
|

|-
|Welterweight
|Tim Menzies
|def.
|Nathan Jones
|Decision (majority)
|align=center|3
|align=center|5:00
|
|-
|Flyweight
|Pietro Menga
|def.
|Steve McCombe
|Submission (rear naked choke)
|align=center|2
|align=center|1:00
|
|-
|Featherweight
|Shay Walsh
|def.
|James Saville
|Decision (unanimous)
|align=center|3
|align=center|5:00
|
|-
|Flyweight
|Rany Saadeh
|def.
|Jody Collins
|Decision (unanimous)
|align=center|3
|align=center|5:00
|For the inaugural BAMMA Flyweight Championship
|-
|Middleweight
|Ion Pascu
|def.
|Lee Chadwick
|Decision (unanimous)
|align=center|3
|align=center|5:00
|

BAMMA 16: Daley vs. da Rocha 

BAMMA 16 was a mixed martial arts event held by the British Association of Mixed Martial Arts (BAMMA) on 14 September 2014.

Fight Card

|-
|Featherweight
|Rob Zabitis
|def.
|James Winstanley
|Decision (unanimous)
|align=center|3
|align=center|5:00
|
|-
|Lightweight
|Tim Barnett
|def.
|Joe Naraynsingh
|TKO 
|align=center|1
|align=center|2:09
|
|-
|Flyweight
|Javonne Morrison
|def.
|Callum McVay
|TKO 
|align=center|2
|align=center|1:09
|
|-
|Welterweight
|Igor Puskarskis
|def.
|Alex Cossey
|Submission (triangle choke)
|align=center|2
|align=center|1:54
|
|-
|Welterweight
||Sam Ferguson
|def.
|James Bray
|TKO 
|align=center|1
|align=center|1:10
|
|-
|Featherweight
|Mike Grundy
|def.
|Anthony Phillips
|Submission (D'arce choke)
|align=center|1
|align=center|2:47
|
|-
|Lightweight
|Marc Diakiese
|def.
|Jefferson George
|Decision (unanimous)
|align=center|3
|align=center|5:00
|
|-
|Middleweight
|Andy De-Vent
|def.
|Roggy Lawson
|TKO
|align=center|3
|align=center|1:44
|
|-
|Featherweight
|Shay Walsh
|def.
|Paul Reed
|Decision (unanimous)
|align=center|3
|align=center|5:00
|

|-
|Bantamweight
|Mike Wootten
|def.
|Antoine Gallinaro
|Submission (rear naked choke)
|align=center|2
|align=center|4:55
|
|-
|Lightweight
|Alexei Roberts
|def.
|Jack Grant
|Decision (unanimous)
|align=center|3
|align=center|5:00
|
|-
|Welterweight
|Leon Edwards (c)
|def.
|Shaun Taylor
|KO (punch)
|align=center|3
|align=center|3:30
|For the BAMMA British Welterweight Championship
|-
|Featherweight
|Tom Duquesnoy (c)
|vs.
|Ashleigh Grimshaw
|No Contest (accidental kick to the groin)
|align=center|
|align=center|
|For the BAMMA World Featherweight Championship
|-
|Welterweight
|Paul Daley
|def.
|Marinho Moreira da Rocha
|KO (punch to the body)
|align=center|2
|align=center|3:40
|

BAMMA 17: Fletcher vs. Brightmon 

BAMMA 17 was a mixed martial arts event held by the British Association of Mixed Martial Arts (BAMMA) on 6 December 2014.

Fight Card

|-
|Featherweight
|Paul Douglas
|def.
|Borys Feldman
|Submission (rear naked choke)
|align=center|1
|align=center|2:28
|
|-
|Featherweight
|Mike Grundy 
|def.
|Michael Cutting 
|Submission (brabo choke)
|align=center|1
|align=center|1:56
|
|-
|Bantamweight
|Regis Sugden 
|def.
|Paul Bentley
|TKO (punches)
|align=center|2
|align=center|0:38
|
|-
|Lightweight
|Marc Diakiese
|def.
|Vernon O'Neil 
|Decision (unanimous)
|align=center|3
|align=center|5:00
|
|-
|Middleweight
|Conor Cooke 
|def.
|Lee Chadwick
|Decision (unanimous)
|align=center|3
|align=center|5:00
|
|-
|Flyweight
|Gareth Pilot
|def.
|Dino Gambatesa
|Submission (rear naked choke)
|align=center|1
|align=center|3:08
|
|-
|Bantamweight
|Mike Wootten
|def.
|Peter Ligier
|Decision (unanimous)
|align=center|3
|align=center|5:00
|

|-
|Featherweight
|Greg Severs 
|def.
|Andy Craven
|Decision (unanimous)
|align=center|3
|align=center|5:00
|
|-
|Featherweight
|Brendan Loughnane
|def.
|Florian Rousseau
|TKO (punches)
|align=center|1
|align=center|4:48
|
|-
|Heavyweight
|Brett McDermott 
|def.
|Oli Thompson
|KO (punches)
|align=center|1
|align=center|1:43
|
|-
|Lightweight
| Martin Stapleton
|def.
|Sebastian Fournier
|Submission (rear naked choke)
|align=center|1
|align=center|3:44
|
|-
|Lightweight
| Colin Fletcher
|def.
|Michael Brightmon
|TKO (corner stoppage)
|align=center|2
|align=center|5:00
|
|}

BAMMA 18: Duquesnoy vs. Klaczek 

BAMMA 18 was a mixed martial arts event held by the British Association of Mixed Martial Arts (BAMMA) on 21 February 2015.

Fight Card

|-
|Lightweight
|Nathan Clayton
|def.
|Josh Abraham
|KO (punch)
|align=center|1
|align=center|1:45
|
|-
|Light Heavyweight
|Tom Aspinall
|def.
|Ricky King
|Submission (heel hoke)
|align=center|1
|align=center|0:49
|
|-
|Bantamweight
|Regis Sugden
|def.
|Manuel Bilic
|Submission (triangle choke)
|align=center|1
|align=center|4:18
|
|-
|Featherweight
|Mike Grundy
|def.
|Mamadou Gueye
|Submission (brabo choke)
|align=center|1
|align=center|3:35
|
|-
|Flyweight
|Chris Miah
|def.
|Mick Gerrard
|KO (punch)
|align=center|2
|align=center|4:37
|

|-
|Bantamweight
|Michael Cutting 
|def.
|Nathaniel Wood
|Submission (armbar)
|align=center|1
|align=center|3:26
|
|-
|Heavyweight
|Artur Gluchowski 
|def.
|Stuart Austin
|Decision (split)
|align=center|3
|align=center|5:00
|
|-
|Middleweight
|Cheick Kone
|def.
|Chris Fields
|TKO (punches)
|align=center|1
|align=center|0:23
|
|-
|Lightweight
|Alexei Roberts
|def.
|Hayden Critchfield
|TKO (punches)
|align=center|2
|align=center|2:19
|
|-
|Featherweight
|Tom Duquesnoy (c)
|def.
|Krzysztof Klaczek
|TKO (body kick & punches)
|align=center|3
|align=center|1:37
|For the BAMMA World Featherweight Championship
|}

BAMMA 19: Stapleton vs. Petley 

BAMMA 19 was a mixed martial arts event held by the British Association of Mixed Martial Arts (BAMMA) on 28 March 2015.

Fight Card

|-
|Heavyweight
|Tom Aspinall
|def.
|Satish Jamia
|TKO (punches)
|align=center|1
|align=center|0:09
|
|-
|Featherweight
| Damian Stasiak
|def.
|Mike Grundy
|Submission (triangle choke)
|align=center|2
|align=center|4:18
|
|-
|Lightweight
|Lewis Monarch
|def.
|David Johnson 
|TKO (punches)
|align=center|1
|align=center|0:09
|
|-
|Welterweight
| Nathan Jones
|def.
|Oskar Somerfeld
|Submission (triangle choke)
|align=center|1
|align=center|1:40
|
|-
|Lightweight
|Damian Frankiewicz
|def.
|Paul Douglas
|Submission (rear naked choke)
|align=center|3
|align=center|4:02
|
|-
|Heavyweight
|Mark Godbeer
|def.
|Thomas Denham
|TKO (punches)
|align=center|1
|align=center|1:33
|

|-
|Featherweight
|Brendan Loughnane
|def.
|Steve Polifonte
|Decision (unanimous)
|align=center|3
|align=center|5:00
|
|-
|Heavyweight
| Kamil Bazelak 
|def.
| Karl Etherington
|TKO (punches)
|align=center|1
|align=center|4:13
|
|-
|Middleweight
|Andy De-Vent
|def.
| Conor Cooke
|Submission (rear naked choke)
|align=center|1
|align=center|
|For the BAMMA Lonsdale British Middleweight Championship
|-
|Lightweight
|Marc Diakiese
|def.
|Jack McGann
|Decision (unanimous)
|align=center|3
|align=center|5:00
|For the BAMMA Lonsdale British Lightweight Championship
|-
|Lightweight
|Martin Stapleton 
|def.
|Jeremy Petley
|TKO (head kick)
|align=center|3
|align=center|0:23
|
|}

BAMMA 20: Lazarz vs. McDermott 

BAMMA 20 was a mixed martial arts event held by the British Association of Mixed Martial Arts (BAMMA) on 25 April 2015. 
Rany Saadeh was scheduled to defend his BAMMA Flyweight Championship again Chris Miah, but 4 days before the event Saadeh got an infection and was not medically cleared by doctors to compete. Spanish fighter Daniel Barez stepped in on short notice and fought against Miah in a non-title bout.

Fight Card

|-
|Welterweight
|Oliver Paske
|def.
|Arthur Jakub
|Submission (guillotine choke)
|align=center|1
|align=center|2:18
|
|-
|Featherweight
|Aiden Lee
|def.
|Adam Jahovic
|Decision (unanimous)
|align=center|3
|align=center|5:00
|
|-
|Lightweight
|Harry Marple 
|def.
|Chris Astley 
|Submission (Japanese necktie)
|align=center|2
|align=center|1:41
|
|-
|Bantamweight
|Regis Sugden 
|def.
|Ant Phillips
|TKO (punches)
|align=center|1
|align=center|3:51
|
|-
|Featherweight
|Chase Morton
|def.
|Wayne Drake
|TKO (punches)
|align=center|1
|align=center|4:07
|
|-
|Welterweight
|Jack Grant
|def.
|Warren Kee
|KO (punches)
|align=center|1
|align=center|1:04
|
|-
|Lightweight
|Rick Selvarajah
|def.
|Jefferson George
|Decision (split)
|align=center|3
|align=center|5:00
|

|-
|Flyweight
|Chris Miah
|def.
|Daniel Barez
|Submission (rear naked choke)
|align=center|2
|align=center|1:46
|
|-
|Bantamweight
|Ed Arthur
|def.
|Alan Philpott
|Submission (rear naked choke)
|align=center|2
|align=center|0:56
|For the Inaugural BAMMA World Bantamweight Championship
|-
|Lightweight
|Andre Winner
|def.
|Colin Fletcher 
|Decision (unanimous)
|align=center|3
|align=center|5:00
|
|-
|Light Heavyweight
|Marcin Lazarz 
|def.
|Brett McDermott 
|Decision (unanimous)
|align=center|3
|align=center|5:00
|For the Vacant BAMMA World Light Heavyweight Championship
|}

BAMMA 21: DeVent vs. Kone 

BAMMA 21: DeVent Vs. Kone was a mixed martial arts event held by the British Association of Mixed Martial Arts (BAMMA) on 13 June 2015.

Fight Card

|-
|Welterweight
|Ben Bennett
|def.
|Daniel Cassell
|Submission (triangle choke)
|align=center|1
|align=center|2:59
|
|-
|Lightweight
|Mateusz Figlak
|def.
|Nathan Clayton
|Decision (unanimous)
|align=center|3
|align=center|5:00
|
|-
|Flyweight
|Jamie Powell
|def.
|Arnaud Dos Santos
|Submission (rear naked choke)
|align=center|2
|align=center|3:32
|
|-
|Lightweight
|Mike Grundy
|def.
|Damian Frankiewicz
|Submission (arm triangle choke)
|align=center|1
|align=center|3:59
|
|-
|Heavyweight
|Thomas Denham
|def.
|Ashley Pollard
|KO (punches)
|align=center|1
|align=center|0:52
|
|-
|Lightweight
|obias Reid 
|def.
| Wayne Drake
|TKO (punches)
|align=center|1
|align=center|1:27
|
|-
|Heavyweight
|Stuart Austin
|def.
|Tom Aspinall
|Submission (heel hook)
|align=center|2
|align=center|3:59
|
|-
|Welterweight
|Harry Marple
|def.
|Sergiu Berdila
|KO (knee)
|align=center|1
|align=center|1:23
|
|-
|Bantamweight
|Shay Walsh 
|def.
|Gaz Pilot
|TKO (punches)
|align=center|3
|align=center|3:44
|
|-

|-
|Lightweight
|Jack McGann
|def.
|Aziz Stringer
|TKO (punches)
|align=center|1
|align=center|2:08
|
|-
|Lightweight
|Rob Sinclair 
|def.
|Michael Brightmon
|TKO (punches)
|align=center|1
|align=center|3:37
|
|-
|Heavyweight
|Mark Godbeer
|def.
|Paul Taylor 
|TKO (retirement)
|align=center|2
|align=center|4:43
|For the Inaugural BAMMA World Heavyweight Championship
|-
|Middleweight
|Cheick Kone 
|def.
|Andy DeVent
|TKO (knees & punches)
|align=center|1
|align=center|3:57
|For the Vacant BAMMA World Middleweight Championship
|}

BAMMA 22: Duquesnoy vs. Loughnane 

BAMMA 22: Duquesnoy vs. Loughnane was a mixed martial arts event held by the British Association of Mixed Martial Arts (BAMMA) on 19 September 2015.

Fight Card

|-
|Bantamweight
|Dylan Tuke
|def.
|Adam Caffrey
|Submission (rear naked choke)
|align=center|1
|align=center|3;27
|
|-
|Welterweight
|Rhys McKee
|def.
|John Redmond
|Submission (rear naked choke)
|align=center|1
|align=center|1:38
|
|-
|Heavyweight
| Łukasz Parobiec
|def.
|Johnny Dargan
|TKO (punches)
|align=center|1
|align=center|3:27
|
|-
|Bantamweight
|Frans Mlambo
|def.
|Darren O'Gorman
|TKO (punches)
|align=center|1
|align=center|2:45
|
|-
|Women's Bantamweight
|Sinead Kavanagh
|def.
|Hatice Ozyurt
|TKO (punches)
|align=center|1
|align=center|0:17
|
|-
|Lightweight
|Kane Mousah
|def.
|Myles Price
|Decision (unanimous)
|align=center|3
|align=center|5:00
|
|-
|Lightweight
|Marc Diakiese
|def.
|Rick Selvarajah
|TKO (punches)
|align=center|1
|align=center|0:24
|For the BAMMA Lonsdale British Featherweight Championship
|-
|Middleweight
|Paul Byrne
|def.
|Conor Cooke
|TKO (punches)
|align=center|1
|align=center|2:06
|
|-
|Lightweight
|Jack McGann
|def.
|Jack Grant
|TKO (punches)
|align=center|1
|align=center|0:52
|
|-

|-
|Women's Atomweight
|Celine Haga
|def.
|Catherine Costigan
|Submission (arm bar)
|align=center|1
|align=center|4:46
|
|-
|Bantamweight
|Alan Philpott
|def.
|Regis Sugden
|Decision (split)
|align=center|3
|align=center|5:00
|For the Inaugural BAMMA Lonsdale British Bantamweight Championship
|-
|Middleweight
| Christopher Jacquelin
|def.
|Chris Fields
|Submission (triangle choke)
|align=center|2
|align=center|4:55
|
|-
|Featherweight
|Tom Duquesnoy (c)
|def.
|Brendan Loughnane
|Decision (split)
|align=center|3
|align=center|5:00
|For the BAMMA World Featherweight Championship
|}

BAMMA 23: Night of Champions 

BAMMA 23: Night of Champions was a mixed martial arts event held by the British Association of Mixed Martial Arts (BAMMA) on 14 November 2015.

Fight Card

|-
|Bantamweight
|Nathaniel Wood
|def.
|Bryan Creighton
|Decision (unanimous)
|align=center|3
|align=center|5:00
|
|-
|Lightweight
|Jai Herbert
|def.
|Ben Bennett
|KO (body kick)
|align=center|2
|align=center|3:59
|
|-
|Bantamweight
|Cameron Else 
|def.
|Jay Butler
|TKO (strikes)
|align=center|1
|align=center|2:48
|
|-
|Lightweight
|Tobias Reid
|def.
|Craig Clarkson
|TKO (punches)
|align=center|2
|align=center|1:43
|
|-
|Light Heavyweight
|Brett McDermott
|def.
|Pelu Adetola
|TKO (strikes)
|align=center|1
|align=center|1:57
|
|-
|Heavyweight
|Stuart Austin
|def.
|Thomas Denham
|KO (punch)
|align=center|2
|align=center|1:55
|For the BAMMA Lonsdale British Heavyweight Championship
|-
|Flyweight
|Nad Narimani
|def.
|Jeremy Petley
|TKO (punches)
|align=center|1
|align=center|2:26
|
|-
|Lightweight
|Damien Lapilus
|def.
|Jack McGann
|Submission (rear naked choke)
|align=center|1
|align=center|3:30
|
|-

|-
|Bantamweight
|Shay Walsh
|def.
|Edward Arthur (c)
|Decision (unanimous)
|align=center|3
|align=center|5:00
|For the BAMMA World Bantamweight Championship
|-
|Flyweight
|Rany Saadeh (c)
|def.
|Shajidul Haque
|Decision (unanimous)
|align=center|3
|align=center|5:00
|For the BAMMA World Flyweight Championship
|-
|Light Heavyweight
|Paul Craig (c)
|def.
|Marcin Lazarz 
|Submission (triangle)
|align=center|1
|align=center|3:51
|For the BAMMA World Light Heavyweight Championship
|-
|Lightweight
|Martin Stapleton
|def.
|Gavin Sterritt
|Submission (rear naked choke)
|align=center|1
|align=center|1:18
|For the Vacant BAMMA World Lightweight Championship
|}

BAMMA 24: Kone vs. Phillips 

|-
|Women's Featherweight
|Sinead Kavanagh
|def.
|Zarah Fairn Dos Santos
|Decision (split)
|align=center|3
|align=center|5:00
|
|-
|Featherweight
|James Gallagher
|def.
|Gerard Gilmore
|Submission (rear naked choke)
|align=center|1
|align=center|2:55
|
|-
|Bantamweight
|Declan Dalton
|def.
|Mike Cutting
|Decision (unanimous)
|align=center|3
|align=center|5:00
|
|-
|Featherweight
|Brian Moore
|def.
|Mick Brennan 
|TKO (punches)
|align=center|1
|align=center|2:39
|
|-
|Featherweight
|Dylan Tuke
|def.
|Mark Andrew
|TKO (knee & punches)
|align=center|1
|align=center|0:51
|
|-
|Welterweight
|Peter Queally
|def.
|Nathan Jones
|Decision (unanimous)
|align=center|3
|align=center|5:00
|
|-
|Lightweight
|Myles Price
|def.
|Mario Saeed
|TKO (punches)
|align=center|1
|align=center|1:04
|

|-
|Bantamweight
|Alan Philpott (c)
|def.
|Nathaniel Wood
|Doctor Stoppage (broken nose)
|align=center|3
|align=center|3:40
|For the BAMMA Lonsdale British Bantamweight Championship
|-
|Light Heavyweight
|Chris Fields
|def.
|Dan Konecke
|Submission (D'arce Choke)
|align=center|1
|align=center|4:39
|
|-
|Bantamweight
|Tom Duquesnoy
|def.
|Damien Rooney
|TKO (punch)
|align=center|1
|align=center|1:22
|
|-
|Middleweight
|Andy DeVent
|def.
|Paul Byrne 
|TKO (punches)
|align=center|1
|align=center|0:59
|
|-
|Middleweight
|John Phillips
|def.
| Cheick Kone (c)
|TKO (punch)
|align=center|1
|align=center|1:05
|For the BAMMA World Middleweight Championship
|}

BAMMA 25: Champion vs. Champion 

|-
|Lightweight
|Jai Herbert
|def.
|Tony Morgan
|Submission (rear naked choke)
|align=center|2
|align=center|2:19
|
|-
|Featherweight
|Dean Trueman
|def.
|Huseyin Garabet
|Submission (guillotine)
|align=center|1
|align=center|4:48
|
|-
|Welterweight
|Terry Brazier
|def.
|Issey Francis Buangala
|Submission (rear naked choke)
|align=center|1
|align=center|0:38
|
|-
|Lightweight
|Rick Selvarajah
|def.
|Oliver Coyne
|Submission (rear naked choke)
|align=center|1
|align=center|3:52
|
|-
|Heavyweight
|Łukasz Parobiec
|def.
|Tom Aspinall
|DQ (strikes to back of the head)
|align=center|2
|align=center|3:33
|
|-
|Lightweight
|Xavier Sedras 
|def.
|Chris Bungard
|Submission (rear naked choke)
|align=center|2
|align=center|2:58
|
|-
|Featherweight
|Mike Grundy
|def.
|Marley Swindells
|Decision (unanimous)
|align=center|3
|align=center|5:00
|
|-
|Light Heavyweight
| Brett McDermott
|def.
|Jamie Sloan
|KO/TKO (punch)
|align=center|1
|align=center|3:58
|
|-
|Bantamweight
|Ed Arthur
|def.
|Cameron Else
|KO/TKO (punches)
|align=center|1
|align=center|4:57
|
|-
|Middleweight
|Matt Hallam
|def.
|Alexander Bergman
|KO/TKO (punches)
|align=center|2
|align=center|1:27
|
|-
|Featherweight
|Ronnie Mann
|def.
|Graham Turner
|KO/TKO (punch)
|align=center|1
|align=center|1:18
|

|-
|Lightweight
|Marc Diakiese (c)
|def.
|Kane Mousah
|KO/TKO (punch)
|align=center|1
|align=center|0:36
|For the BAMMA Lonsdale British Lightweight Championship
|-
|Heavyweight
|Mark Godbeer (c)
|def.
|Stuart Austin
|KO/TKO (punches)
|align=center|2
|align=center|1:24
|For the BAMMA World Heavyweight Championship
|-
|Welterweight
| Walter Gahadza 
|def.
|Colin Fletcher
|DQ (illegal elbows)
|align=center|1
|align=center|0:12
|
|-
|Lightweight
|Martin Stapleton (c)
|def.
|Damien Lapilus
|DQ (illegal knee to downed opponent)
|align=center|2
|align=center|0:38
|For the BAMMA World Lightweight Championship
|-
|Bantamweight
|Tom Duquesnoy 
|def.
|Shay Walsh (c)
|KO/TKO (elbow)
|align=center|1
|align=center|1:15
|For the BAMMA World Bantamweight Championship
|}

BAMMA 26: Saadeh vs. Young 

|-
|Light Heavyweight
|Ben Forsyth
|def.
|Pelu Adetola
|Decision (unanimous)
|align=center|3
|align=center|5:00
|
|-
|Bantamweight
|Darren O'Gorman
|def.
|Gary Morris
|Submission (rear naked choke)
|align=center|3
|align=center|3:02
|
|-
|Middleweight
|John Redmond
|def.
|Glenn Irvine
|KO/TKO (punch)
|align=center|2
|align=center|0:19
|
|-
|Welterweight
|Keith McCabe
|def.
|Aidan Brooks
|Submission (armbar)
|align=center|1
|align=center|1:31
|
|-
|Featherweight
|Rickie Smullen
|def.
|Andrew Murphy
|Submission (heel hock)
|align=center|1
|align=center|1:16
|
|-
|Bantamweight
|Blaine O'Driscoll
|def.
|Mark Andrew
|Decision (unanimous)
|align=center|3
|align=center|5:00
|
|-
|Flyweight
|Ryan Curtis
|def.
|Shamsul Haque
|Decision (unanimous)
|align=center|3
|align=center|5:00
|
|-
|Featherweight
|Rhys McKee
|def.
|Tommy McCafferty
|KO/TKO (punches)
|align=center|1
|align=center|0:58
|
|-
|Welterweight
|Joe McColgan
|def.
|Peter Queally
|Decision (unanimous)
|align=center|3
|align=center|5:00
|

|-
|Bantamweight
|Alan Philpott (c)
|def.
|Aaron Blackwell
|Decision (unanimous)
|align=center|3
|align=center|5:00
|For the BAMMA Lonsdale British Bantamweight Championship
|-
|Women's Bantamweight
|Sinead Kavanagh
|def.
|Katarzyna Sadura
|KO/TKO (punches)
|align=center|1
|align=center|2:46
|
|-
|Lightweight
| Paul Redmond
|def.
|Chris Stringer
|Decision (unanimous)
|align=center|3
|align=center|5:00
|
|-
|Flyweight
|Rany Saadeh (c)
|def.
|Andy Young
|Decision (unanimous)
|align=center|3
|align=center|5:00
|For the BAMMA World Flyweight Championship
|}

BAMMA 27: Duquesnoy vs. Philpott 

|-
|Bantamweight
| Ian Cleary
|def.
|Andrew Lofthouse
|Decision (unanimous)
|align=center|3
|align=center|5:00
|
|-
|Bantamweight
|Blaine O'Driscoll
|def.
|Neil Ward
|Decision (unanimous)
|align=center|3
|align=center|5:00
|
|-
|Welterweight
|Kiefer Crosbie
|def.
|Conor Riordan
|Submission (triangle choke)
|align=center|2
|align=center|2:32
|
|-
|Welterweight
|Richard Kiely 
|def.
|Keith McCabe
|KO/TKO (body kick)
|align=center|1
|align=center|2:03
|
|-
|Welterweight
|Terry Brazier
|def.
|Niklas Stolze
|Decision (unanimous)
|align=center|3
|align=center|5:00
|

|-
|Welterweight
|Nathan Jones
|def.
|Walter Gahadza
|Decision (split)
|align=center|3
|align=center|5:00
|
|-
|Lightweight
|Rhys McKee
|def.
|Jai Herbert
|KO/TKO (punches)
|align=center|1
|align=center|1:47
|For the vacant BAMMA Lonsdale British Lightweight Championship
|-
|Bantamweight
|Tom Duquesnoy (c)
|def.
|Alan Philpott
|Submission (rear naked choke)
|align=center|2
|align=center|3:35
|For the BAMMA World Bantamweight Championship
|}

BAMMA 28: Parke vs. Redmond 

This event was co-promoted alongside Bellator 173

|-
|Featherweight
|Paul Hughes
|def.
|Adam Gustab
|TKO/KO (Punches)
|align=center|1
|align=center|1:32
|
|-
|Featherweight
|Jonathan Brookins
|def.
| Declan Dalton
|Decision (unanimous)
|align=center|3
|align=center|5:00
|
|-
|Welterweight
| Will Fleury
|def.
|Kyle McClurkin
|TKO/KO (Punches) 
|align=center|1
|align=center|2:49
|
|-
|Welterweight
|Keith McCabe
|def.
|Glenn Irvine
|Submission (Heel Hook)
|align=center|1
|align=center|0:39
|
|-
|Featherweight
||O. Olejniczak
|def.
|Jonathan Reid
|KO/TKO (Punches)
|align=center|1 
|align=center|1:47
|
|-
|Featherweight
|Daniel Rutkowski
|def.
|Niall Smith
|TKO/KO (Punches)
|align=center|3
|align=center|2:16
|
|-
|Featherweight
|Andrew Murphy
|def.
|Stephen Kilifin
|KO/TKO (Punches)
|align=center|1
|align=center|4:58
|

|-
|Lightweight
|Tim Barnett
|def.
|Rhys McKee (c)
|KO/TKO (Punches and Knees)
|align=center|1
|align=center|4:58
|For the BAMMA Lonsdale British Lightweight Championship
|-
|Featherweight
|Damien Lapilus 
|def.
|Ronnie Mann
|Decision (unanimous)
|align=center|3
|align=center|5:00
|For the vacant BAMMA World Featherweight Championship
|-
|Flyweight
|Andy Young 
|def.
|Dominique Wooding
|Submission (Rear-Naked Choke)
|align=center|3
|align=center|3:06
|For the Interim BAMMA World Flyweight Championship
|-
|Lightweight
|Norman Parke
|def.
|Paul Redmond
|Decision (unanimous)
|align=center|3
|align=center|5:00
|For the BAMMA World Lightweight Championship. Parke missed the championship weight limit (155 lbs, Parke weighed in at 155.8 lbs), meaning only Redmond was eligible to win the title.
|}

BAMMA 29: McDermott vs. Wolf 

|-
|Featherweight
|Daniel Crawford 
|def.
|Ronnie Mann
|KO/TKO (punches)
|align=center|1
|align=center|3:28
|-
|Catchweight (73 kg)
|David Khalsa
|def.
|Cian Cowley
|Submission (rear naked choke)
|align=center|1
|align=center|2:40
|-
|Welterweight 
|Daniel Cassel 
|vs.
|Daniel Olejniczak
|Draw (majority)
|align=center|3
|align=center|5:00
|-
|Bantamweight
|Shay Walsh 
|def.
|Aaron Blackwell
|Decision (unanimous)
|align=center|3
|align=center|5:00
|-
|Lightweight
|Jai Herbert
|def.
|Rick Selvarajah
|KO/TKO (punches)
|align=center|2
|align=center|0:37
|-
|Welterweight
|Lukasz Swirydowicz 
|def.
|Mick Stanton 
|KO/TKO (punches)
|align=center|2
|align=center|0:09
|-
|Featherweight
|Daniel Rutkowski
|def.
|Cameron Hardy
|KO/TKO (ground & pound)
|align=center|2
|align=center|2:13
|-
|Flyweight
|Sam Halliday 
|def.
|Mike D’Aguiar
|Submission (triangle choke)
|align=center|1
|align=center|1:28
|-
|Heavyweight
|Mindagus Gerve
|def.
|Maciej Sosnowski 
|KO/TKO
|align=center|2
|align=center|4:38
|-
|Middleweight
|Nathais Frederick 
|def.
|Pelu Adetola
|KO/TKO (punches)
|align=center|2
|align=center|2:32
|-
|Middleweight
|Aaron Chalmers
|def.
|Greg Jenkins
|Submission (Americana)
|align=center|1
|align=center|2:09

|-
|Welterweight
|Terry Brazier 
|def.
|Walter Gahadza
|Submission (keylock)
|align=center|1
|align=center|4:28
|For the vacant BAMMA Lonsdale British Welterweight Championship
|-
|Lightweight
|Tim Barnett (c) 
|def.
|Mario Saeed
|KO (punches)
|align=center|1
|align=center|3:34
|For the BAMMA Lonsdale British Lightweight Championship
|-
|Middleweight
|Yannick Bahati 
|def.
|Matt Hallam
|Submission (rear-naked choke)
|align=center|2
|align=center|2:19
|For the vacant BAMMA World Middleweight Championship
|-
|Heavyweight
|Brett McDermott 
|def.
|Ruben Wolf
|TKO (punches)
|align=center|2
|align=center|0:54
|For the vacant BAMMA World Heavyweight Championship
|}

BAMMA 30: Walsh vs. Philpott

|-
|Welterweight
|Ion Pascu
|def.
|Henry Fadipe
|KO/TKO (punch)
|1
|4:16
|-
|Welterweight
|Kiefer Crosbie
|def.
|Waldemar Cichy
|KO/TKO (elbows)
|1
|2:01
|-
|Welterweight
|Richard Kiely 
|def.
|Daniel Olejniczak
|KO/TKO (punches)
|2
|
|-
|Welterweight
|Maciek Gierszewski 
|def.
|Steve Owens
|KO/TKO
|1
|4:20
|-
|Light Heavyweight
|Matt Clempner 
|def.
|Ben Forsyth
|Submission (triangle choke)
|1
|1:49
|-
|Featherweight
|Decky Dalton
|def.
|Mick Brennan
|KO/TKO (doctor stoppage)
|2
|1:15
|-
|Featherweight
|Arann Maguire
|def.
|Dylan Logan
|KO/TKO (punches)
|3
|4:20
|-
|Bantamweight
|Blaine O'Driscoll 
|def.
|Harry Hardwick
|Submission (rear naked choke)
|2
|4:45
|-
|Lightweight
|Chris Stringer 
|def.
|Niklas Stolze
|Decision (unanimous)
|3
|5:00
|-
|Lightweight
|Richie Smullen 
|vs.
|Rhys McKee
|Draw (majority)
|3
|5:00
|-

|-
|Middleweight
|Fabian Edwards
|def.
|Aaron Kennedy
|Submission (rear naked choke)
|2
|0:44
|-
|Lightweight
|Paul Redmond
|def.
|Rob Sinclair
|Submission (knee bar)
|2
|2:11
|-
|Flyweight
|Daniel Barez 
|def.
|Ryan Curtis
|Decision (unanimous)
|3
|5:00
||For the inaugural BAMMA Lonsdale Flyweight Championship
|-
|-
|Bantamweight
|Shay Walsh
|vs.
|Alan Philpott
|No Contest (Kick to Head of Grounded Fighter)
|1
|2:50
||For the vacant BAMMA World Bantamweight Championship
|-
|}

BAMMA 31: Jones vs. Lohore

|-
|Welterweight
|Tommy King 
|def.
|James Reedman
|TKO (Punches)
|1
|1:12
|-
|Featherweight
| David Khalsa
|def.
| Charlie Boy Howard
|Decision (split)
|3
|5:00
|-
|Middleweight
|Alex Montagnani 
|def.
|Martin Hudson 
|TKO (Punches)
|1
|2:08
|-
|Lightweight
|Nathan Rose 
|def.
|Ollie Mathis
|Decision (Split)
|3
|5:00
|-
|Bantamweight
|Javid Basharat
|def.
|Tony Hall
|Submission (Guillotine Choke)
|2
|1:42
|-
|Featherweight
|Liam Davies
|def.
|Tanvir Boora
|TKO (Elbows)
|2
|3:56

|-
|Featherweight
|Daniel Crawford 
|def.
|Damien Lapilus (c)
|TKO (Punches)
|2
|0:26
||For the BAMMA World Featherweight Championship
|-
|Welterweight
|Aaron Chalmers
|def.
|Alex Thompson
|KO (Punch)
|1
|0:30
|-
|Middleweight
|Mike Shipman 
|def.
|Yannick Bahati (c)
|KO (Spinning Back Fist)
|3
|1:20
||For the BAMMA World Middleweight Championship
|-
|Welterweight
|Alex Lohore 
|def.
|Nathan Jones
|KO (Knee)
|1
|4:13
||For the vacant BAMMA World Welterweight Championship
|-
|}

BAMMA 32: Lohore vs. Kiely

This event was co-promoted alongside Bellator 187

|-
|Welterweight
|Ion Pascu
|def.
|Omar Jesus-Santana
|Decision (split)
|3
|5:00
|-
|Flyweight
|Dylan Tuke
|def.
|David Khalsa
|TKO (punches)
|2
|1:09
|-
|Bantamweight
|Dominique Wooding
|def.
|Blaine O'Driscoll
|KO
|3
|1:47
|-
|Flyweight
|Daniel Barez 
|def.
|Andy Young (ic)
|Decision (unanimous)
|3
|5:00
|For the vacant BAMMA World Flyweight Championship
|-
|Welterweight
|Alex Lohore (c)
|def.
|Richard Kiely
|Submission (knee bar)
|1
|4:23
|For the BAMMA World Welterweight Championship
|-
|}

BAMMA 33: Scope vs. Lebout

This event was co-promoted alongside Bellator 191

|-
|Welterweight
|Justin Burlinson
|def.
|Josh Plant 
|Submission (rear-naked choke)
|1
|2:53
|-
|Lightweight
|Rhys McKee
|def.
|Kams Ekpo
|Submission (triangle choke)
|2
|2:08
|-
|Welterweight
|Adam Proctor
|def.
|Nathan Jones 
|Submission (rear-naked choke)
|1
|3:35
|-
|Heavyweight
|Darren Towler
|def.
| Tony Mustard
|TKO (Punches)
|1
|0:56
|-
|Catchweight (175 lbs)
|Curt Warburton
|def.
|Warren Kee
|TKO (punches)
|1
|1:03

|-
|Welterweight
|Anthony Dizy
|def.
|Colin Fletcher
|Decision (unanimous)
|3
|5:00
|-
|Middleweight
|Fabian Edwards
|def.
|Louis King
|Submission (rear-naked choke)
|1
|1:15
|-
|Welterweight
|Aaron Chamlers
|def.
|Karl Donaldson
|TKO (punches)
|1
|0:43
|-
|Lightweight
|Ryan Scope
|def.
|Mickaël Lebout
|Decision (split)
|3
|5:00
|For the vacant BAMMA World Lightweight Championship
|}

BAMMA 34: Lohore vs. Brazier

|-
|Featherweight
|Jonas Magard
|def.
|Diego Barbosa
|Decision (unanimous)
|align=center|3
|align=center|5:00
|
|-
|Welterweight
|Marcin Zywica
|def.
|Karl Donaldson
|Submission (guillotine choke)
|align=center|1
|align=center|1:02
|
|-
|Welterweight
|Josh Plant
|def.
|John Nicholls
|Submission (heel hook)
|align=center|1
|align=center|0:55
|
|-
|Welterweight
|Justin Burlinson
|def.
|Tommy King
|TKO (punches)
|align=center|1
|align=center|2:54
|

|-
|Welterweight
|James Reedman
|def.
|Jahreau Shepherd
|TKO (strikes)
|align=center|2
|align=center|3:04
|
|-
|Featherweight
|Nathan Rose
|def.
|David Khalsa
|Decision (unanimous)
|align=center|3
|align=center|5:00
|
|-
|Bantamweight
|Dominique Wooding
|def.
|Dominic Dillon 
|TKO (knees & strikes)
|align=center|2
|align=center|0:55
|
|-
|Lightweight
|Steve O’Keefe
|def.
|Martyn Harris
|Submission (rear naked choke)
|align=center|1
|align=center|1:07
|
|-
|Welterweight
|Colin Fletcher
|def.
|Walter Gahadza
|Submission (armbar)
|align=center|2
|align=center|1:50
|
|-
|Middleweight
|Fabian Edwards
|def.
|Kent Kauppinen
|Submission (armbar)
|align=center|1
|align=center|4:52
|

|-
|Lightweight
|Rhys McKee 
|def.
|Tim Barnett
|TKO (strikes)
|align=center|1
|align=center|4:30
|For the vacant BAMMA World Lightweight Championship
|-
|Heavyweight
|Chi Lewis-Parry
|vs.
|Stav Economou
|No Contest (illegal elbow strikes)
|align=center|1
|align=center|1:36
|For the interim BAMMA World Heavyweight Championship
|-
|Welterweight
|Terry Brazier 
|def.
|Alex Lohore (c)
|Decision (split)
|align=center|3
|align=center|5:00
|For the BAMMA World Welterweight Championship
|}

BAMMA 35: Lohore vs. Pascu

|-
|Welterweight
|Maciek Gierszewski
|def.
|Karl McCalig
|KO/TKO 
|align=center|1
|align=center|3:16
|-
|Bantamweight
|Matiss Zaharovs
|def.
|Austin Lynch
|KO/TKO 
|align=center|2
|align=center|2:33
|-
|Welterweight
|James Sheehan
|def.
|Dillon Manning
|Submission (rear naked choke)
|align=center|1
|align=center|2:45
|-
|Middleweight
|Diarmuid O Buachalla
|def.
| Martin Ward
|KO/TKO 
|align=center|1
|align=center|0:31
|-
|Welterweight
|Pawel Politylo
|def.
|Nathan Kelly
|Decision (split)
|align=center|3
|align=center|5:00
|-
|Welterweight
|Daniel Olejniczak
|def.
|Steve Owens
|Decision (unanimous)
|align=center|3
|align=center|5:00
|-
|Lightweight
|Sam Slater
|def.
|Jeanderson Castro
|Submission (rear naked choke)
|align=center|2
|align=center|2:36
|-
|Lightweight
|Myles Price
|def.
|Phil Raeburn
|Decision (unanimous)
|align=center|3
|align=center|5:00
|-
|Lightweight
|Anthony Taylor
|def.
|Dean Barry
|Submission (rear naked choke)
|align=center|2
|align=center|0:39

|-
|Flyweight
|Blaine O'Driscoll
|def.
|Aaron Robinson
|Submission (rear naked choke)
|align=center|1
|align=center|2:52
|-
|Middleweight
|Fabian Edwards
|def.
|Claudio Conti
|KO/TKO (body kick)
|align=center|1
|align=center|1:00
|-
|Welterweight
|Kiefer Crosbie
|def.
|Josh Plant
|KO/TKO (punches)
|align=center|1
|align=center|3:47
|-
|Welterweight
|Ion Pascu 
|def.
|Alex Lohore
|Decision (unanimous)
|align=center|3
|align=center|5:00
|-
|}

BAMMA Fight Night: London 

|-
|Lightweight
|Terry Brazier
|def.
|Rhys McKee
|Decision (unanimous)
|align=center|3
|align=center|5:00
|-
|Featherweight
|Anthony Taylor
|def.
|Mike Hales
|Decision (unanimous)
|align=center|3
|align=center|5:00
|-
|Heavyweight
|Chi Lewis Parry
|vs.
|Łukasz Parobiec
|Draw (majority)
|align=center|3
|align=center|5:00
|-
|Lightweight
|John Nicholls
|def.
|David Khalsa
|Submission (rear naked choke)
|align=center|2
|align=center|3:04
|-
|Flyweight
|Elliott Hoye
|def.
|Luke Shanks
|KO/TKO (punches)
|align=center|3
|align=center|1:57
|-
|Welterweight
|Jefferson George
|def.
|James Reedman
|Decision (unanimous)
|align=center|3
|align=center|5:00
|-
|Featherweight
|Kingsley Crawford
|def.
|Akonne Wanliss
|Decision (unanimous)
|align=center|3
|align=center|5:00
|}

References

BAMMA
BAMMA events
Mixed martial arts in the United Kingdom
Sport in London
Sport in Birmingham, West Midlands
Sport in Manchester
2009 in mixed martial arts
2010 in mixed martial arts
2011 in mixed martial arts
2012 in mixed martial arts
2013 in mixed martial arts
2014 in mixed martial arts
2015 in mixed martial arts
2016 in mixed martial arts